Eric Sanders is an American football coach who is the inside linebackers coach for Stanford. Previously he was a defensive assistant for the New York Jets of the National Football League (NFL).  Sanders was on the Oakland Raiders coaching staff when Hue Jackson was the head coach.  He worked as a student with the UC Davis football program before graduating in 2005 with a degree in psychology with a biological emphasis.

He has experience coaching at the college level with UC Davis, Utah State, and Stanford.  He spent five years in the NFL with the Oakland Raiders, then returned to the college ranks with Stanford before joining the Browns in 2016.

Coaching career

Early Coaching Career
Sanders began his coaching career in 2003 while still a student at UC Davis as a student assistant coach and video coordinator. He remained in that role until 2005 where with UC Davis he traveled to the Far East for coaches clinics with the American Football in China Exchange Association. In 2006 he was promoted to an on the field role and he worked as the team’s offensive line and tight ends coach. In 2007 he worked as a graduate assistant for Utah State. In 2008 he returned to his alma mater to work as the team’s linebackers coach a position he held until after the 2009 season.

Oakland Raiders
In 2010 and 2011 Sanders worked for the Oakland Raiders as an offensive quality control coach. From 2012 to 2014 he worked as a defensive quality control coach.

Stanford (first stint)
In 2015 Sanders worked at Stanford as a defensive assistant for the Cardinal.

Cleveland Browns
From 2016 to 2018, Sanders worked for the Browns as a defensive assistant. He was not retained by Freddie Kitchens.

New York Jets
In 2019 he worked for the Jets as a defensive assistant under Adam Gase.

Stanford (second stint)
In 2020 Sanders rejoined the Cardinal this time as the teams inside linebackers coach.

Personal life
Sanders is from San Francisco, California. He and his wife, Maki Ishihara-Sanders, have a son.

References

External links
 Stanford profile

1983 births
Living people
Players of American football from San Francisco
UC Davis Aggies football players
Coaches of American football from California
UC Davis Aggies football coaches
Utah State Aggies football coaches
Oakland Raiders coaches
Stanford Cardinal football coaches
Cleveland Browns coaches
New York Jets coaches